Bronwyn Laidlaw (born 27 December 1974) is a former Australian rugby union player. 

Laidlaw made her Wallaroos test debut in 1997 against the United States in Brisbane. She was part of Australia’s first Rugby World Cup squad that competed at the 1998 tournament in the Netherlands. She had dislocated her collarbone in the Wallaroos quarter-final loss to England in 1998 but continued playing. She was also named in the 2002 and 2006 Rugby World Cup squads. 

In April 2022, Laidlaw was one of more than 100 former Queensland women’s players who were honoured with caps at the Reds and Melbourne Rebels Super W match at Suncorp Stadium.

References 

1974 births
Living people
Australian female rugby union players
Australia women's international rugby union players